Jazmin Sawyers (born 21 May 1994) is a British track and field athlete and sports presenter who competes in the long jump. She has also competed as a bobsledder and a heptathlete. Sawyers won the silver medal in the long jump at the 2014 Commonwealth Games. She claimed silver and bronze at the 2016 and 2022 European Championships respectively. She won her first major senior title at the 2023 European Indoor Championships. Sawyers earned silver at the 2015 European Under-23 Championships.

She won bronze in the long jump at the 2012 World Junior Championships and silver at the 2013 European Junior Championships. Sawyers competed at both the 2016 Rio and the 2020 Tokyo Olympics,  finishing eighth in the event on both occasions. She is the British indoor record holder for the long jump with an outright best of 7.00 m. Sawyers is a five-time national champion. In 2017, she competed in the sixth series of The Voice UK.

Early life
Jazmin Sawyers was born in Stoke-on-Trent to a Jamaican father and an English mother, who later became the Chief Constable of Staffordshire. She was initially a child gymnast, participating in the sport from the age of four. At ten years old she began to take part in athletics events at school and decided to start practising in various events.

Sawyers studied for a degree in law at Bristol University, graduating with a 2:1.

Athletics career
As part of City of Stoke Athletics Club, Sawyers focused mainly on high jump and long jump. The following year, Sawyers won the English Schools' titles in the long jump and the pentathlon – a feat she repeated in 2009. In 2010, she won a scholarship to study at Millfield public school.

Youth and junior medals
Sawyer's first international appearances came in 2011. At the World Youth Championships, she placed ninth in the heptathlon. She cleared six metres in the long jump for the first time that year and surpassed that mark to win the gold in the event at the Commonwealth Youth Games. She was also a 4 × 100 metres relay champion with England at that event.

Sawyers' bobsleigh training at the start of 2012 meant she was ill-prepared for heptathlon in the summer. She opted to focus on the long jump instead, as this combined well with the explosive strength training she had undertaken for the winter sport. Sawyers' performance was the second best wind-legal jump by a junior woman that year.

She gained a place at the University of Sheffield and began training there as well with local coach Toni Minichiello. She continued her focus on the long jump into the 2013 season. Sawyers was runner-up at the BUCS University Championships indoor and outdoors. She repeated that placing at her two major events that year, taking silver behind Shara Proctor at the UK Championships then another silver at the European Junior Championships behind Malaika Mihambo of Germany. At the end of the track and field season, Sawyers won her first meet abroad at the Gugl Games in Linz, Austria. She changed university to study law and criminology at Bristol University. She based her training near the University of Bath, however, working with coach and former long jumper Alan Lerwill.

2014: Commonwealth silver

Outdoors, she had a string of victories (including a win at the Universities Championships) in the buildup to the European Team Championships, where she placed ninth overall. Sawyers was again second best to Johnson-Thompson at the outdoor National Championships but both gained selection for the long jump for England at the 2014 Commonwealth Games. However, Johnson-Thompson withdrew prior to the championships and the other leading English athlete Proctor could not compete in the final due to injury, making Sawyer's England's leading medal hope.

2020–2022
Sawyers became a triple British champion when winning the long jump event at the 2020 outdoor British Championships with a jump of 6.69 metres. She had previously won the event back in 2016.

At the 2020 Summer Olympics, held in Tokyo in 2021, Sawyers finished 8th in the final with a distance of 6.80 metres.

At the 2022 World Championships in Eugene, Oregon, she was in third position after all finalists had made their first jump, but was pushed just outside the top 8 when the eventual winner Malaika Mihambo made her first valid jump at the third attempt. She ended in ninth place with a distance of 6.62. At the Munich European Championships that year, Sawyers was in fourth position after five attempts. Ukraine's Maryna Bekh-Romanchuk was in third with 6.76 until Sawyers snatched bronze with 6.80 in the last round, reversing the outcome of 2018 when Bekh-Romanchuk displaced Sawyers from the podium with her last jump of the competition.

2023–present: first major senior title
In March 2023, Sawyers captained Great Britain at the European Indoor Championships held in Istanbul. She qualified for the final with her first jump, and went on to jump 7.00 m to win gold, setting a national indoor record and outright best in the process.

Bobsleigh career
In 2011, Sawyers was approached by the British Bobsleigh and Skeleton Association to train for the inaugural Youth Winter Olympics. Acting as brakewoman, she formed a two-man bob team with Mica McNeill. In January 2012 she represented Great Britain at the bobsleigh at the 2012 Winter Youth Olympics and Sawyers and McNeill became the country's first ever medal-winning team at the competition (and the only medallists for Britain that year), taking the silver medals behind the Dutch team. As a result, she was chosen as one of the carriers for the 2012 Olympic torch relay.

Other activities
Sawyers is a singer/songwriter in her spare time and, in February 2017 appeared in ITV's The Voice UK. She was successful in securing Will.i.am as her coach during the 'blind auditions', though she told the programme her main priority remained with athletics. She was eliminated from the programme on 26 February in a sing-off against fellow singer Hayley Eccles.
Sawyers was an Ambassador for Right To Play, the world's leading sport for development charity. She visited Right To Play's education programme in Tanzania in 2018.

Statistics

Personal bests
 Long jump –  (Chula Vista, CA 2021)
 Long jump indoor –  (Istanbul 2023)

International competitions

National titles
 British Athletics Championships
 Long jump: 2016, 2020, 2021
 British Indoor Athletics Championships
 Long jump: 2016, 2023

References

External links

 
 

Living people
1994 births
Sportspeople from Stoke-on-Trent
English female bobsledders
English female long jumpers
British female long jumpers
English heptathletes
Olympic female long jumpers
Olympic athletes of Great Britain
Athletes (track and field) at the 2016 Summer Olympics
Bobsledders at the 2012 Winter Youth Olympics
Commonwealth Games silver medallists for England
Commonwealth Games medallists in athletics
Athletes (track and field) at the 2014 Commonwealth Games
Athletes (track and field) at the 2018 Commonwealth Games
World Athletics Championships athletes for Great Britain
European Athletics Championships medalists
British Athletics Championships winners
Black British sportswomen
Alumni of the University of Sheffield
Alumni of the University of Bristol
English people of Jamaican descent
Team Bath track and field athletes
Team Bath winter athletes
Athletes (track and field) at the 2020 Summer Olympics
Medallists at the 2014 Commonwealth Games